James Duncan Scurlock (born September 15, 1971) is an American director, producer, writer and financial adviser. He is probably best known for his documentary Maxed Out: Hard Times, Easy Credit and the Era of Predatory Lenders and his book, Maxed Out: Hard Times in the Age of Easy Credit.  His most recent book, King Larry: The Life and Ruins of a Billionaire Genius, is a biography of Larry Hillblom.

Biography
Born in Seattle, Washington, he attended the Wharton School, University of Pennsylvania, studying finance, but left in his senior year without receiving a degree. While in college, he opened four restaurants, which he sold in 1994. He then moved to Dallas, where he published a successful investing newsletter titled Restaurant Investor and wrote freelance for several magazines.

In 2002, Scurlock moved to Los Angeles, to pursue a career in filmmaking. His first documentary, Parents of the Year (2004), was featured in over 25 film festivals and won numerous awards, including the Audience Award at the Los Angeles Film Festival and the Jury Awards at the Austin Film Festival, the USA Film Festival and the Palm Springs Short Film Festival. Parents of the Year was bought by HBO and broadcast extensively on HBO Latino. Scurlock's second short, Stumped! (2005), follows three eccentric citizens who run against Arnold Schwarzenegger for Governor of California. His first feature length documentary was the critically acclaimed Maxed Out: Hard Times, Easy Credit and the Era of Predatory Lenders (2006), which he also produced.

Scurlock also wrote a major book based on Maxed Out. In conjunction with the global release of the film, his book, Maxed Out: Hard Times in the Age of Easy Credit (2006), was published through Scribner, a division of Simon & Schuster.

In 2008, Scurlock received The Ridenhour Book Prize for Maxed Out: Hard Times in the Age of Easy Credit.

In early 2012, Scurlock released King Larry: The Life and Ruins of a Billionaire Genius, a biography of the DHL co-founder, Larry Hillblom.

Personal life
James Scurlock lives in Palm Springs, California.

Publishing history

Film
Maxed Out: Hard Times, Easy Credit and the Era of Predatory Lenders

Books
Maxed Out: Hard Times in the Age of Easy Credit  
King Larry: The Life and Ruins of a Billionaire Genius

References

External links
"Washington Post" – "Maxed Out' Man James Scurlock, Right on the Money"
The Wall Street Journal – "The Wallet – Inside the Brain of...James Scurlock, Director of Maxed Out"
Saipan Tribune – "Filmmaker focuses camera on Hillblom"
San Francisco Chronicle – "In debt up to our eyeballs"

1971 births
Living people
Film producers from California
American male screenwriters
American documentary film directors
American finance and investment writers
American self-help writers
Writers from Seattle
Writers from Santa Monica, California
American restaurateurs
Financial advisors
Wharton School of the University of Pennsylvania alumni
Film directors from California
American male non-fiction writers
Screenwriters from California
Screenwriters from Washington (state)
Film producers from Washington (state)